This is a list of wars involving the United Arab Emirates and its predecessor states

References

 
United Arab Emirates
Wars